Chelmsford is a constituency in Essex represented in the House of Commons of the UK Parliament since 2017 by Vicky Ford of the Conservative Party. In September 2022, she was appointed by Prime Minister Liz Truss as Minister of State for Development in the Foreign, Commonwealth and Development Office.

The constituency was created in 1885 and existed until 1997 when it was abolished and replaced by two new constituencies: Maldon and East Chelmsford and West Chelmsford. It was recreated in 2010 following the Fifth Periodic Review of Westminster constituencies.

History 
Chelmsford was one of eight single-member divisions of Essex (later classified as county constituencies) created by the Redistribution of Seats Act 1885, replacing the three two member divisions of East, South and West Essex. It continued in existence until it was briefly abolished for the 1997 general election following the Fourth Periodic Review of Westminster Constituencies, but re-established for the 2010 general election as a Borough Constituency by the Fifth Review.

During its latter years, the old seat was narrowly won by a Conservative over strong Liberal Democrat performances, including their predecessor party the Liberal Party. Historically, the constituency has on occasion been referred to as 'Mid Essex', especially in the early part of the 20th Century.

Boundaries and boundary changes 
1885–1918: The Sessional Divisions of Brentwood (except the parishes of Rainham and Wennington) and Chelmsford.

Formed from parts of the abolished West Division, including Chelmsford, and part of the South Division, including Brentwood and Billericay.

1918–1945: The Borough of Chelmsford, the Urban District of Brentwood, the Rural Districts of Chelmsford and Ongar, and in the Rural District of Billericay the parishes of Hutton, Ingrave, Mountnessing, Shenfield, and South Weald.

Gained eastern part of the Epping Division, including Chipping Ongar. The south-western corner, including Upminster, transferred to Romford and southernmost parts, including the town of Billericay, transferred to the South-Eastern Division.

1945–1950: The Borough of Chelmsford, the Urban District of Brentwood, and the Rural Districts of Chelmsford and Ongar.

Minor changes following the reorganisation of local authorities, involving the abolition of the Rural District of Billericay and the expansion of the Urban District of Brentwood.

1950–1955: The Borough of Chelmsford, and the Rural Districts of Chelmsford and Ongar.

Brentwood transferred to Romford.

1955–1974: The Borough of Chelmsford, and the Rural District of Chelmsford.

The Rural District of Ongar included in the new County Constituency of Chigwell.

1974–1983: The Borough of Chelmsford, and in the Rural District of Chelmsford the parishes of Danbury, East Hanningfield, Great Baddow, Highwood, Ingatestone and Fryerning, Little Baddow, Margaretting, Mountnessing, Rettendon, Runwell, Sandon, South Hanningfield, Stock, West Hanningfield, and Woodham Ferrers.

Northern parts of the Rural District of Chelmsford transferred to the new County Constituency of Braintree.

1983–1997: The Borough of Chelmsford wards of All Saints, Baddow Road, Boreham and Springfield, Cathedral, Danbury and Sandon, East and West Hanningfield, Galleywood, Goat Hall, Great Baddow Village, Highwood and Margaretting, Little Baddow, Mildmays, Moulsham Lodge, Oaklands, Patching Hall, Rothmans, St Andrew's, Stock, The Lawns, and Waterhouse Farm.

Gained the Boreham and Springfield ward from Braintree.  Two parishes (Ingatestone and Fryerning, and Mountnessing), included in the District of Brentwood under the Local Government Act 1972, were transferred to the County Constituency of Brentwood and Ongar.  South-eastern areas, including South Woodham Ferrers, included in the new County Constituency of Rochford.

For the 1997 general election the constituency was abolished. Northern and western areas forming the majority of the new County Constituency of West Chelmsford; eastern areas included in the new County Constituency of Maldon and East Chelmsford; and a small area in the south included in the new County Constituency of Rayleigh.

2010–present: The City of Chelmsford wards of Chelmer Village and Beaulieu Park, Galleywood, Goat Hall, Great Baddow East, Great Baddow West, Marconi, Moulsham and Central, Moulsham Lodge, Patching Hall, St Andrew's, Springfield North, The Lawns, Trinity, and Waterhouse Farm.

Following the Boundary Commission's Fifth Periodic Review of Westminster constituencies in 2007, Parliament re-established Chelmsford as a borough constituency for the 2010 general election. For the previous three elections the constituency had been split in two halves and included more surrounding rural settlements.  A majority of the electorate for this new constituency came from the previous West Chelmsford constituency. A smaller element (Great Baddow and Galleywood) came from the Maldon & East Chelmsford constituency.

The new constituency coincides with the built-up area which comprises the City of Chelmsford.

At its first contest in 2010, the seat was closely fought by the Conservatives and the Liberal Democrats, who finished less than 10% apart, with Conservative candidate Simon Burns (the former MP for West Chelmsford) being elected. Labour polled 11%, despite having been only around 100 votes behind the Liberal Democrats in West Chelmsford in 2005, and even taking second place in 2001.

Members of Parliament

Elections

Elections in the 2010s

* Served in the 2005–2010 Parliament as MP for West Chelmsford

Elections in the 1990s

Elections in the 1980s

Elections in the 1970s

Elections in the 1960s

Elections in the 1950s

Elections in the 1940s 

General Election 1939–40:

Another General Election was required to take place before the end of 1940. The political parties had been making preparations for an election to take place from 1939 and by the end of this year, the following candidates had been selected; 
Conservative: John Macnamara
Labour: Mary Day

Elections in the 1930s

Elections in the 1920s

Elections in the 1910s

Elections in the 1900s

Elections in the 1890s

Elections in the 1880s

Boundary changes

See also
List of parliamentary constituencies in Essex

Notes

References
Specific
Craig, F. W. S. (1983). British parliamentary election results 1918–1949 (3 ed.). Chichester: Parliamentary Research Services. .

General

Sources
F. W. S. Craig, British Parliamentary Election Results 1974 – 1983
The Times Guide to the House of Commons 1983, 1987 & 1992

External links 
nomis Constituency Profile for Chelmsford — presenting data from the ONS annual population survey and other official statistics.

Parliamentary constituencies in Essex
Constituencies of the Parliament of the United Kingdom established in 1885
Constituencies of the Parliament of the United Kingdom disestablished in 1997
Constituencies of the Parliament of the United Kingdom established in 2010
Chelmsford